The Kingston Town Classic is a Perth Racing Group 1 Thoroughbred horse race run under Weight for Age conditions for three year olds and older over a distance of 1800 metres at Ascot Racecourse in Perth, Western Australia in early December. Total prizemoney is A$1,500,000.

History

The race was named after the Australian Racing Hall of Fame horse, Kingston Town, who won the race in 1982. The stakemoney was increased to A$1 million in 2015.

Name

1976–1979 - Marlboro 50,000
1980–1983 - Western Mail Classic
1984–1987 - Rothwells Stakes
1988–1991 - Winfield Stakes
1992–1994 - Beat Diabetes 2 Stakes
1995–2006 - Fruit 'N' Veg Stakes
2007–2021 - Kingston Town Classic
2022            - Northerly Stakes

Distance
1976–1998 – 1800 metres
 1999–2000 – 1600 metres
2001–2002 – 1800 metres
 2003 – 2000 metres
 2004 onwards - 1800 metres

Grade
1976–1978 - Principal race
1979 onwards - Group 1

Double winners
Five horses have won it twice:
 Family of Man (1976, 1978), Summer Beau (1996/1997), Old Comrade (2000/2001), Niconero (2006, 2008), Playing God (2010/2011) 
Thoroughbreds that have won the Railway Stakes – Kingston Town Classic double:
 Better Loosen Up (1989), Old Comrade (2001),  Modem (2004),  Sniper's Bullet (2009)

Winners

 2021 - Regal Power
 2020 - Truly Great
 2019 - Kay Cee
 2018 - Arcadia Queen
 2017 - Pounamu
 2016 - Stratum Star
 2015 - Perfect Reflection
 2014 - Moriarty
2013 - Ihtsahymn
2012 - Luckygray
2011 - Playing God
2010 - Playing God
2009 - Sniper's Bullet
2008 - Niconero
2007 - Megatic
2006 - Niconero
2005 - Early Express
2004 - Modem
2003 - True Steel
2002 - Blevvo
2001 - Old Comrade
2000 - Old Comrade
1999 - St. Clemens Belle
1998 - Old Nick
1997 - Summer Beau
1996 - Summer Beau
1995 - Forge On
1994 - Island Morn
1993 - Credit Account
1992 - Red Javelin
1991 - Old Role
1990 - Bar Landy
1989 - Better Loosen Up
1988 - Vo Rogue
1987 - Doodlakine Lass
1986 - Military Plume
1985 - Rant And Rave
1984 - Importune
1983 - Bounty Hawk
1982 - Kingston Town 
1981 - Little Imagele 
1980 - Sovereign Red 
1979 - Mighty Kingdom 
1978 - Family Of Man 
1977 - Stormy Rex 
1976 - Family Of Man

See also

 List of Australian Group races
 Group races

References

Group 1 stakes races in Australia
Open mile category horse races
Sport in Perth, Western Australia